The 2011 South Holland District Council election took place on 5 May 2011 to elect members of the South Holland District Council in England. It was held on the same day as other local elections.

Results

Council composition
Following the last election in 2007, the composition of the council was:

After the election, the composition of the council was:

LI - Lincolnshire Independents

Ward results
Incumbent councillors are denoted by an asterisk (*). References -

Crowland & Deeping St. Nicholas

Donington Quadring & Gosberton

Fleet

Gedney

Holbeach Hurn

Holbeach Town

Long Sutton

Moulton Weston & Cowbit

Pinchbeck & Surfleet

Spalding Castle

Spalding Monks House

Spalding St. Johns

Spalding St. Marys

Spalding St. Pauls

Spalding Wygate

Sutton Bridge

Brewis was previously elected as an Independent councillor.

The Saints

Whaplode & Holbeach St. Johns

Creese was previously elected as an Independent councillor.

References

2011 English local elections
May 2011 events in the United Kingdom
2011
2010s in Lincolnshire